This is a list of people who have served as Lord Lieutenant of Stirling and Falkirk.  This office replaced the Lord Lieutenant of Stirlingshire in 1975.

Edward Younger, 3rd Viscount Younger of Leckie 1975–1979 (previously Lord Lieutenant of Stirlingshire)
 Maj-Gen. Frederick Clarence Campbell Graham,  26 September 1979 – 1983
 Lt-Col. James Stirling of Garden,  30 November 1983 – 2005
 Marjory Jane McLachlan,  28 November 2005 – 15 February 2017
 Alan Gordon Simpson,  28 February 2017

References

External links
Stirling & Falkirk Lieutenancy

Stirling and Falkirk
Politics of Stirling (council area)
People associated with Stirling (council area)